The Jennings Ford Automobile Dealership is a historic automobile dealership located at 431 South 4th Street in Springfield, Illinois. Ford dealer Frank Jennings built the dealership in 1919. The automobile became widespread in Springfield in the 1910s; Jennings Ford was one of several dealerships to open on South 4th Street, which was then the city's automobile row. The three-story building integrated every major function of an auto dealership at the time; it included a sales floor, a service center, a car wash, a storage garage, and a repainting facility. While Jennings Ford closed between 1927 and 1933, the building remained a car dealership through the 1950s. It is one of the few remaining dealership buildings in downtown Springfield and is the best-preserved of the survivors. Today, the building houses an operations center for Illinois National Bank.

The building was added to the National Register of Historic Places on May 31, 2006.

References

Commercial buildings on the National Register of Historic Places in Illinois
National Register of Historic Places in Springfield, Illinois
Buildings and structures in Springfield, Illinois
Auto dealerships on the National Register of Historic Places
Transportation buildings and structures on the National Register of Historic Places in Illinois
Ford Motor Company